Asahel Perry (February 26, 1784 – February 16, 1869) was a politician and community leader in Utah Territory.

Perry was born in Williamsburg, Massachusetts.  He converted to Church of Jesus Christ of Latter Day Saints at some point in the 1830s and served a mission for the church in New York in 1840.  He came to Utah Territory in 1850 and was the branch president of Springville for a year starting at its founding.  Perry was also one of the original members of the Utah Territorial Council, roughly equivalent to a state senate.

References

1784 births
1869 deaths
People from Williamsburg, Massachusetts
Converts to Mormonism
Mormon pioneers
Members of the Utah Territorial Legislature
19th-century American politicians
American leaders of the Church of Jesus Christ of Latter-day Saints
American Mormon missionaries in the United States
19th-century Mormon missionaries
Latter Day Saints from Massachusetts
Latter Day Saints from Utah